KRSE (105.7 FM, "The Hawk") is a radio station broadcasting a classic rock format. Licensed to Yakima, Washington, United States, the station serves the Yakima area.  The station is currently owned by Stephens Media Group.

On August 29, 2014, at 5PM, after playing "Rock Me Amadeus" by Falco, KRSE changed their format from adult hits (as "Bob FM") to classic rock, branded as 105.7 The Hawk; the first song as "The Hawk" was "Welcome to the Jungle" by Guns 'N Roses.

References

External links

Classic rock radio stations in the United States
RSE
Radio stations established in 1977